Los Cerritos Ranch House, also known as Rancho Los Cerritos or Casa de los Cerritos, in Long Beach, California, was "the largest and most impressive adobe residence erected in southern California during the Mexican period". Los Cerritos means "the little hills" in English.  It was declared a National Historic Landmark in 1970.

History
The structure, a Monterey Colonial adobe, was built in 1844 for merchant Jonathan Temple, a Yankee pioneer who became a Mexican citizen.  The house was once the headquarters for a  ranch; the major activity on the ranch was cattle and sheep.

The land was part of the  Rancho Los Nietos land grant to Manuel Nieto that was eventually divided into six parcels, one of which was Rancho los Cerritos.  In 1843, Temple purchased the rancho and built the adobe house in 1844 as headquarters for his cattle operations. In 1866, Temple sold the rancho to Flint, Bixby & Company which converted the ranch from cattle to sheep.  Jotham Bixby, the brother of one of the company's founders, managed and resided at the ranch from 1866 to 1881.  Jotham Bixby, known as the "father of Long Beach", eventually purchased the property for himself and raised seven children at the adobe. One of Jotham's children who was raised at the ranch house was Fanny Bixby Spencer, who later became known as a philanthropist, poet, and pacifist.

Beginning in the late 1870s, Bixby began leasing or selling portions of the ranch, which became the cities of Downey, Paramount and Lakewood.  Between the 1880s and 1920, the adobe fell into disrepair.  In 1929, Llewellyn Bixby (Jotham's nephew) purchased the property, and made extensive renovations to the house, including plaster cement coating, a new red-tiled roof, electricity, plumbing, fireplaces, a sun porch, new floors and much of the landscaping.  Llewellyn Bixby died in 1942, and the family sold the house to the City of Long Beach in 1955.  The City turned the house into a museum dedicated to educating the public about California's rancho period.

Operation as a museum
Rancho Los Cerritos Historic Site was converted into, and remains, a public museum operated by the Rancho Los Cerritos Foundation in partnership with the City of Long Beach. It is open for tours, programs and events on Wednesdays through Sundays. The house is furnished in a Victorian fashion as it would have been when Jotham Bixby raised his family there in the 1870s.  There is a visitor center with exhibits about the site's history from Native American times to the present.  A formal Italian garden includes olive, pomegranate and cypress trees planted by Temple.  The site also features a 3,000-volume California history research library and a museum shop. 

The museum was closed for 17 months from 2001–2002 to allow for seismic retrofitting, removal of lead paint and asbestos insulation, brickwork repairs and modifications to improve accessibility for the disabled.

Gallery

See also
Los Cerritos Neighborhood
Rancho Los Alamitos
List of City of Long Beach Historic Landmarks
National Register of Historic Places listings in Los Angeles County, California
Ranchos of California
California Historical Landmarks in Los Angeles County

References

External links

Adobe buildings and structures in California
Historic house museums in California
Museums in Long Beach, California
National Historic Landmarks in California
Houses on the National Register of Historic Places in California
Buildings and structures on the National Register of Historic Places in Los Angeles County, California
Historic American Buildings Survey in California
Houses completed in 1844
Landmarks in Long Beach, California
Houses in Long Beach, California
California Historical Landmarks